Firecracker is virtualization software developed by Amazon Web Services. It makes use of KVM.

References

External links 
 
 

Amazon Web Services
Free software programmed in Rust
Free virtualization software